10 Things You Don't Know About is an American history/biography television series on H2. It was initially presented by historian David Eisenbach for one season. Eisenbach was succeeded as host by musician Henry Rollins for the next two seasons. Each episode of the show presents ten facts about a particular historical figure, group, event, or aspect that are not widely known among the general public. Each fact is accompanied by relevant clips and, during Rollins's tenure, interviews with experts, as well as man-on-the-street interviews. The first season also featured results of an online poll surrounding the ten facts.

The episodes originally ran for 30 minutes (with commercial breaks) each during Eisenbach's tenure; the episodes became twice as long when Rollins took over hosting duties.

The show's first season, which featured Eisenbach, aired on February 27, 2012, running through May 7, 2012. The second season, featuring Rollins, began airing on November 2, 2013. The third season, also hosted by Rollins started on August 16, 2014.

A&E Home Video released the first season of the series on DVD on August 28, 2012.

Episodes

Season 1

Season 2

Season 3

References

External links

10 things to know about Vietnam

2012 American television series debuts
History (American TV channel) original programming
English-language television shows
2014 American television series endings